Louellen Poore (born January 30, 1970) is an American former soccer player who played as a defender, making two appearances for the United States women's national team.

Career
In college, Poore played for the North Carolina Tar Heels where she was a letter-winner and NCAA champion in all four seasons (1988, 1989, 1990, 1991). In 86 appearances, she scored 7 goals and registered 5 assists. She was a Soccer America First-Team and NSCAA Second-Team All-American in 1991. That year she was also included in the All-ACC Conference Selection and All-ACC Tournament Selection. In 1992, she was the recipient of the North Carolina Women's Soccer Athletic Director's Scholar-Athlete Award.

Poore made her international debut for the United States on August 14, 1992 in a friendly match against Norway, which finished as a 1–3 loss. She earned her second and final cap two days later against the same opponent, which finished as a 2–4 loss.

Personal life
Poore graduated from the University of North Carolina at Chapel Hill with a Bachelor of Arts in December 1992.

Career statistics

International

References

1970 births
Living people
People from Land o' Lakes, Florida
Soccer players from Tampa, Florida
American women's soccer players
United States women's international soccer players
Women's association football defenders
North Carolina Tar Heels women's soccer players